The Trapper Nelson Zoo Historic District, also known as Trapper Nelson Hunting Camp and Trapper Nelson Interpretive Site, is an historic district located south of Hobe Sound, Florida, in the United States. It is inside Jonathan Dickinson State Park at 16450 Southeast Federal Highway. On October 3, 2006, it was added to the National Register of Historic Places.

History
Vince "Trapper" Nelson developed a zoo on his property in the 1950s, and his camp and zoo became popular tourist attractions, where such celebrities as Gene Tunney and Gary Cooper visited. He was known locally as the "Tarzan of the Loxahatchee". He was found dead in his cabin by a friend in 1968, and his death was ruled a suicide. His land was acquired by the state of Florida, and is now part of Jonathan Dickinson State Park.

After the land was converted to a park, but still unopen to the public, the camp was often vandalized. One of Nelson's tool sheds was burned down; the arsonist attempted to burn other buildings but was unsuccessful.

In April 1984, park rangers discovered Nelson's "treasure": a hiding place in his chimney held 5,005 coins, totaling $1,829.46. The coins ranged in date from the 1890s to the 1960s. A thorough search of the camp was conducted before revealing the find to the public, but nothing more was found.

The camp still stands today, with his cabin, a guest cabin, a chickee shelter, docks, a boathouse, and assorted cages from his zoo. There are also fruit trees that he planted, including surinam cherry, Java plum and wild almond.

See also

Loxahatchee River
Jonathan Dickinson State Park

References

External links
 Weekly List Of Actions Taken On Properties: 10/16/06 Through 10/20/06 at National Register of Historic Places

Hobe Sound, Florida
Historic districts on the National Register of Historic Places in Florida
National Register of Historic Places in Martin County, Florida
Buildings and structures in Martin County, Florida
Tourist attractions in Martin County, Florida